Fatimah Asghar is a South Asian American poet and screenwriter. Co-creator and writer for the Emmy-nominated webseries Brown Girls, their work has appeared in Poetry, Gulf Coast, BuzzFeed Reader, The Margins, The Offing, Academy of American Poets, and other publications.

Asghar is a member of the Dark Noise Collective and a Kundiman Fellow. She received the Ruth Lilly and Dorothy Sargent Rosenberg Poetry Fellowship from the Poetry Foundation in 2017, and has been featured on the Forbes 30 Under 30 list.

Early life
Asghar's mother was from Jammu and Kashmir and fled with her family during Partition related violence. Her father was from Pakistan. Her parents immigrated to the United States. They both died by the time she was five, leaving her an orphan. "As an orphan, something I learned was that I could never take love for granted, so I would actively build it," she told HelloGiggles in 2018.

Asghar's identity as an orphan is a major theme in her work, her poem "How'd Your Parents Die Again?" opens with the lines:

Again? As though I told you how the first time.
Everyone always tries to theft, bring them back out the grave.
In her poem "Super Orphan," Asghar once again explores the impact of their absence.

Woke up, parents still

dead. Outside, the leaves yawn,

re-christen themselves as spring.

After high school Asghar attended Brown University, where she majored in International Relations and Africana Studies. It was not until she was in college that Asghar learned about how the Partition of India had deeply impacted her family. Her uncle described how the family was forced to leave Kashmir for Lahore and told her about the impact of being refugees in a new land affected them. Learning about her family's firsthand experience during partition had a profound effect on Asghar and her work. ""I've been constantly thinking about it, and looking back into it and trying to understand exactly what happened," she said in 2018.

Along with her orphanhood, the legacy of Partition is another major theme in her poetry. "Partition is always going to be a thing that matters to me and influences me," she once said. "When your people have gone through such historical violence, you cannot shake it."

Brown Girls
In 2017, Asghar and Sam Bailey released their acclaimed web series Brown Girls. Written by Asghar and directed by Bailey, the series is based on Asghar's friendship with the artist Jamila Woods and their experiences as two women of color navigating their twenties. The two main characters are a queer Pakistani-American writer and an African-American musician and are played by Nabila Hossain and Sonia Denis respectively.

"Often, our friends joke that we are each other’s life partners, or 'real wifeys.'" Asghar told NBC News of her friendship with Woods. "And in a lot of ways we are. Jamila gets me through everything. She’s seen me at my worst, at my best, at my most insecure — everything."

Brown Girls received an Emmy nomination in 2017 in the Outstanding Short Form Comedy or Drama Series category.

Works 
After (YesYes Books, 2015)
If They Come for Us (One World/Random House, 2018)
Halal if You Hear Me, co-edited with Safia Elhillo (Haymarket Books, 2019)
When We Were Sisters (One World/ Random House, 2022)

Awards
When We Were Sisters was longlisted for the inaugural Carol Shields Prize for Fiction in 2023.

References

External links 
 Fatimah Asghar's website
 Profile at the Poetry Foundation

American writers of Pakistani descent
American women poets
American women screenwriters
Living people
Year of birth missing (living people)
21st-century American poets
American LGBT writers
American LGBT poets
21st-century American screenwriters
LGBT Muslims
21st-century American women writers